Dom Aleixo, officially Dom Aleixo Administrative Post, is an administrative post in Dili municipality, East Timor, at the mouth of Comoro River. Its seat or administrative centre is Comoro.

The administrative post is named after Aleixo Corte-Real. Its population at the 2010 census was 105,154. Its area is 33,12 km2.

Here are the Presidente Nicolau Lobato International Airport, the ministry for foreign affairs and the main mosque of East Timor. The Tasitolu salt lakes are in the most western part of Dom Aleio in Comoro Suco.

References

External links 

  – information page on Ministry of State Administration site 

Administrative posts of East Timor
Dili Municipality